Henry Gorton (28 October 1871 – 10 January 1900) was an English born South African international rugby union player who played as a forward.

He made 1 appearance for South Africa against the British Lions in 1896.

References

South African rugby union players
South Africa international rugby union players
1871 births
1900 deaths
Rugby union players from Burton upon Trent
Rugby union forwards